American rapper and record producer Ye, better known as Kanye West, has released 10 studio albums, two collaborative studio albums, one compilation album, one demo album, two live albums, one video album and six mixtapes. All ten of his studio albums have been certified at least gold in the United States. As of June 2021, West has certified 25 million equivalent solo albums units in the United States, placing him among the highest-certified music artists in the United States.
 
West's debut album The College Dropout was released in February 2004, and was he album debuted at number two on the US Billboard 200, and was certified double-platinum by the Recording Industry Association of America (RIAA) in  June 2004. In August 2005, West released his second studio album Late Registration, which debuted at number one on the Billboard 200, with first-week sales of 860,000 copies. The album was the ninth best-selling album of 2005 in the United States. In September 2007, Kanye Wests third studio album Graduation debuted at number one on the Billboard 200, selling 957,000 units in its first week, becoming the fastest-selling album in the US since Late Registration, and breaking the record for most digital albums sold in a week. West's fourth studio album 808s & Heartbreak was released in November 2008, and became his third consecutive number one release on the Billboard 200.

In November 2010, West released his fifth studio album My Beautiful Dark Twisted Fantasy, an debuted at number one on the Billboard 200,  with the fourth-highest digital first-week sales ever. Watch the Throne, a collaborative album with Jay-Z, was released in August 2011 and broke the US iTunes first-week sales record. Compilation album Cruel Summer released with his label GOOD Music in September 2012 debuted atop the Top R&B/Hip-Hop Albums chart. West's sixth studio album Yeezus was released in June 2013 and debuted at number one in the United States, United Kingdom, Canada, Australia and New Zealand.

The Life of Pablo was released in February 2016, and made history by becoming the first album to top the  Billboard  200 predominantly from streaming, while also having the second-highest total of first-week streams for an album. In June 2018, West released both his eighth studio album Ye, and his second collaborative album Kids See Ghosts (with Kid Cudi). West released his ninth studio album Jesus Is King in October 2019. The album became West's first to top the Top Christian Albums, and Top Gospel Albums charts. His tenth solo studio album, Donda (2021) recorded the second-biggest first week performance in Spotify's history, in addition to equalling the record for most No. 1 debuts in a row on the Billboard 200, with Eminem (10). Donda 2 was released in February 2022 via the Stem Player.

Studio albums

Collaborative albums

Compilation albums

Demo albums

Live albums

Video albums

Mixtapes

See also
 Kanye West singles discography

References

External links
 Kanye West at AllMusic
 
 

Discographies of American artists
Hip hop discographies